Carrington is a village and civil parish in the East Lindsey district of Lincolnshire, England.

The village was created a township in 1812 after the drainage of the West Fen in 1802, and became a civil parish in 1858. 
The civil parish of Carrington also includes the village of New Bolingbroke,  to the north. and the hamlet of Medlam. The parish has a population of 564 according to the 2001 Census, reducing slightly to 554 at the 2011 Census.

Carrington church is dedicated to St Paul, and was built of red brick in 1816 under the Fen Chapel Act (1816), with its chancel being added in 1872. It is a Grade II listed building.

Carrington's school, the Medlam School, was opened in February 1881 by the West Fen United District School Board which existed from 1879 to 1903. By the time of its closure in 1987 it was known as Carrington County Primary School. Children now attend school in nearby Stickney.

Carrington Rally is an annual event which has taken place each spring for over 50 years, and is a steam and tractor show which supports local charities.

Notable people
Carrington was the birthplace of William Macbride Childs, the son of the Revd William Linington Childs, vicar of Carrington, and first vice-chancellor of the University of Reading.

References

External links

"Carrington", Genuki.org.uk. Retrieved 9 April 2013

Villages in Lincolnshire
Civil parishes in Lincolnshire
East Lindsey District